Globe Rowing Club is a rowing club in Greenwich in the South East of London, England. Established in 1923, the club house and boat house are based on Crane Street in the historic centre of Greenwich, as part of the Trafalgar Rowing Trust. Its crews use the River Thames and the London Regatta Centre at the Royal Docks for water outings. The club admits male and female rowers of all ages, but is particularly known for its high performance junior programme.

History 
The rowing club was originally established at J. Stone & Co's engineering works in Deptford's Arklow Road and was called Stones Rowing Club, with membership restricted to company employees.

In the first years after the club was established, the boats used were heavy Clinker fours, hired from local waterman in East Greenwich and were used mainly on Sunday mornings. This was found to be cost prohibitive and, in time, the club applied to Stone's engineering works for a grant to purchase new equipment. This was refused, and as a result the club broke away from the works and set up independently to attract new members from elsewhere, with headquarters in the nearby Lord Clyde public house (western end of Clyde Street). The club was hence known as the Clyde Rowing Club.

During the mid-1930s, the headquarters were moved to another public house, The Globe on Royal Hill in Greenwich (demolished ), from which the rowing club took its current name, Globe Rowing Club. The club also had a headquarters (1947) at the nearby Mitre public house in Greenwich; and for a time used a decommissioned landing craft moored opposite the Union Tavern (today The Cutty Sark) at Ballast Quay.

Globe was only the second club in East London after Curlew Rowing Club to hold club regattas, with the earliest taking place shortly after the end of the Second World War, the participants being watermen working on nearby Thames shuttles and barges. The club was also the first rowing club in East London to use an eight.

In August 1981, members of Globe Rowing Club set a Guinness World Record for "The greatest distance for paddling a hand propelled bath tub in 24 ...by a team of 25" The record distance set was "60 miles 88 yd".

In 2006, Greenwich Council granted permission, with contributions from Sport England, and the Trafalgar 2001 Trust Ltd for the club to develop the facilities on the corner of Crane Street and Eastney Street, creating a heated, lit boathouse, indoor training room and clubhouse known as the Trafalgar Rowing Centre.

In the early 2010s, Globe's Junior section began a partnership with non-profit organisation London Youth Rowing, to bring indoor and water rowing to increase participation in the sport and allow those from disadvantaged backgrounds to participate. Many of the junior members who have gone on to achieve national and international rowing success have done so as a result of the partnership with LYR.

Notable results 
The club has won eight gold medals at the British Rowing Championships. The Junior section of Globe Rowing Club achieved national and international attention in the 2015–2018 quadrennium for a series of national and international medal wins and the unprecedented inclusion of 6 junior globe members in the Great British rowing trial squad.

Notable results include:

2017 Henley Royal Regatta – Junior Men's  qualify to the heats of the Fawley Challenge Cup and beat Lea Rowing Club

2017 Coupe de la Jeunesse – Callum Sullivan and Jake Offiler: part of the victorious Great British team.

2004 Women's Eights Head of the River  – 2nd: S4 Category (Small Clubs)

Notable members 
Calum Sullivan – member of the winning Cambridge crew in the Boat Race 2019, member of the winning Cambridge reserve boat crew in the Boat Race 2018, 2017 Coupe de la Jeunesse team member.

In 2017, Globe Junior Julia Olawumi became the first rower from the club to commit to an NCAA Division 1 school for rowing choosing the University of Tulsa in Tulsa, Oklahoma.

Honours

British champions

References

External links 
 Globe Rowing Club Website

Sports clubs established in 1923
History of rowing
Rowing clubs in England
1923 establishments in England
Rowing clubs of the River Thames